Jens Christian Berg (23 September 1775 – 4 June 1852) was a Norwegian lawyer and historian.

Biography 
Jens Christian Berg was born in Copenhagen to Niels Jensen Berg (1738-1798) and Marie Margrethe Flor (1744-1817).
After childhood in Trondheim, Berg grew up in Christiania (now Oslo) where he attended Oslo Cathedral School.
He later studied at the University of Copenhagen. In 1803 he took a Danish legal exam, got married and settled at  Gulli  in Sem, Norway.

In 1814, he was appointed as a judge at  Akershus. At the parliament session of 1814, he represented Jarlsberg (now Vestfold). He was also chairman of the committee which was set up in November 1814 to amend the Constitution of Norway. In 1816 he went to Copenhagen as a commissioner to negotiate the separation of Norway from Denmark. From 1828 to 1835, he was a member of the commission which was preparing new criminal code of law. He also sat on the Christiania city council 1837–46.

Family
He married two times, first in 1803 with Hedevig Marie Elisabet Wessel (1773-1816), second in 1817 with Juliane Marie Haxthausen (dead 1847).
He had a son, Fredrik August Berg (1809-1895). He died in Christiania on 4 June 1852.

Honors 
Berg was a made a knight of the  Order of the Polar Star in  1816 and was appointed commander of the Order of St. Olav in 1847.

References

1775 births
1852 deaths
People from Copenhagen
People educated at Oslo Cathedral School
University of Copenhagen alumni
19th-century Norwegian lawyers
19th-century Norwegian historians
Royal Norwegian Society of Sciences and Letters
Knights of the Order of the Polar Star
 Recipients of the St. Olav's Medal